Moon Run is an unincorporated community and coal town in Kennedy and Robinson townships, Allegheny County, Pennsylvania, United States.

References

Unincorporated communities in Allegheny County, Pennsylvania
Coal towns in Pennsylvania
Unincorporated communities in Pennsylvania